The Robert C. Byrd Bridge is a  continuous truss bridge that crosses the Ohio River between Huntington, West Virginia and Chesapeake, Ohio. The crossing was constructed to replace an old, narrow, two-lane structure that was demolished after 69 years of service in a spectacular implosion on July 17, 1995. The previous bridge, opened in 1926, was Huntington's first bridge across the Ohio River and was designed in a gothic style, complete with four two-ton spires that rested on top of each peak.

The groundbreaking ceremony for the four-lane bridge was held on April 30, 1991. James Watkins, of the Ohio Department of Transportation, stated that the importance of the new four-lane span would only be heightened by the construction of the Chesapeake-Proctorville State Route 7 bypass that would "begin in 1996." Work on the bypass did not begin until 2000.

The old 6th Street Bridge closed in the summer of 1993 to allow for the construction of the ramps and approaches in West Virginia and Ohio. The new bridge was named the Robert C. Byrd Bridge under an executive order from former Governor Gaston Caperton to honor the U.S. senator from West Virginia, who is credited with obtaining the funding for the project that was completed on November 6, 1994. The $32.6 million bridge was constructed with $1.4 coming from Ohio, $5.6 coming from West Virginia, and $25.3 in federal funds.

The famous spires which once adorned the top of the former span were saved. One is currently on display outside of the Chesapeake city hall at the intersection of State Route 7 and the Robert C. Byrd Bridge. Two others are installed along 9th Street between 3rd and 5th Avenues.

See also
List of crossings of the Ohio River

References

External links
 Robert C. Byrd Bridge) at Bridges & Tunnels
 Spires from original Sixth Street Bridge - Clio

Road bridges in Ohio
Road bridges in West Virginia
Bridges over the Ohio River
Buildings and structures in Huntington, West Virginia
Buildings and structures in Lawrence County, Ohio
Continuous truss bridges in the United States
Transportation in Lawrence County, Ohio
Transportation in Cabell County, West Virginia
Bridges completed in 1926
Bridges completed in 1994
1926 establishments in Ohio
1926 establishments in West Virginia
Interstate vehicle bridges in the United States